|}

The Committed Stakes is a Listed flat horse race in Ireland open to thoroughbreds aged three years only. It is run at Navan over a distance of 5 furlongs and 164 yards (1,156 metres), and it is scheduled to take place each year in April. The race is named after Committed, an Irish-trained racehorse who was one of the leading sprinters in Europe in the mid-1980s. 

The race was run for the first time in 2016 as the Power Stakes. It took its present name in 2018.

Winners

See also
 Horse racing in Ireland
 List of Irish flat horse races

References
Racing Post:

Flat races in Ireland
Navan Racecourse
Flat horse races for three-year-olds
Recurring sporting events established in 2016
2016 establishments in Ireland